The Great Derangement can refer to:

 The Great Derangement (Taibbi book), a 2008 book by Matt Taibbi
 The Great Derangement: Climate Change and the Unthinkable, a 2016 book by Amitav Ghosh
 The Expulsion of the Acadians, the forced removal by the British of the Acadian people from parts of present-day Canada and Maine, also known as Le Grand Dérangement